The perineal sponge is a spongy cushion of tissue and blood vessels found in the lower genital area of women. It sits between the vaginal opening and rectum and is internal to the perineum and perineal body.

Functions
The perineal sponge is composed of erectile tissue; during arousal, it becomes swollen with blood compressing the outer third of the vagina along with the vestibular bulbs and urethral sponge thereby tightening the vagina and increasing stimulation for the vagina and a penis, if involved.

Sexual stimulation
The perineal sponge is erogenous tissue encompassing a large number of nerve endings, and can, therefore, be stimulated through the back wall of the vagina or the top wall of the rectum. It is most effectively stimulated manually by inserting the thumb and index finger of one hand into the vagina and rectum simultaneously and masturbating the area by gently pinching and rolling it between the finger tips. This area is sometimes called the PS-spot (perineal sponge spot) and stimulating it could lead to orgasm.

References

Human female reproductive system